Michaela Nne Onyenwere (born August 10, 1999) is a Nigerian-American basketball player for the Phoenix Mercury of the Women's National Basketball Association (WNBA) and for the Uni Girona CB of the Liga Femenina de Baloncesto. She played college basketball with the UCLA Bruins of the Pac-12 Conference.

In high school, Onyenwere was named a McDonald's All-American in 2017. Following the 2017–18 season, Onyenwere was named to the Pac-12 All-Freshman Team.

In the 2018–19 season, Onyenwere's sophomore season, she was named to the All-Pac-12 team and to the Media All-Pac-12 team, and she ranked second in the Pac-12 for offensive rebounds per game. After that season, she earned on a spot on the 2019 U.S. Pan-American Games Women's Basketball Team.

In the 2019–20 season, Onyenwere was again named to the All-Pac-12 team, along with her teammate Japreece Dean.

WNBA career 
Onyenwere was drafted 6th overall in the 2021 WNBA Draft by the New York Liberty .

In her rookie season in 2021 Onyenwere was named 2021 WNBA Rookie of the Year, Onyenwere was the leading candidate for most of the season, winning every Rookie of the Month award to become just the fifth player in WNBA history to sweep that honor during a season. As expected the voting was not close, and Onyenwere fell just two votes shy of winning unanimously. Over the course of the season, Onyenwere's playing time and production decreased, Onyenwere was still the most productive player in the class by some margin. She averaged 8.6 points and 2.9 rebounds per game, leading all rookies in scoring and 3-pointers made (37). The last time the leading rookie scorer didn't average double figures was 2005, when Tameka Johnson put up 9.3 points per game for the Washington Mystics. The 2021 draft class was one of the weaker rookie classes in recent history.

In December, 2021, she joined the Catalan team Uni Girona CB of the Spanish Liga Femenina de Baloncesto.

Phoenix Mercury (2023-present) 

On February 11, 2023 Onyenwere was traded to the Phoenix Mercury in a four-team trade involving the New York Liberty, Phoenix Mercury, Dallas Wings, and Chicago Sky.

Career statistics

WNBA

Regular season

|-
| style="text-align:left;"| 2021
| style="text-align:left;"| New York
| 32 || 29 || 22.2 || .401 || .327 || .836 || 2.9 || 0.6 || 0.4 || 0.3 || 1.1 || 8.6
|-
| style="text-align:left;"| 2022
| style="text-align:left;"| New York
| 34 || 1 || 13.7 || .377 || .300 || .836 || 2.1 || 0.4 || 0.4 || 0.2 || 0.7 || 4.7
|-
| style="text-align:left;"| Career
| style="text-align:left;"| 2 years, 1 team
| 66 || 30 || 17.8 || .392 || .319 || .836 || 2.5 || 0.5 || 0.4 || 0.3 || 0.9 || 6.6

Playoffs

|-
|style="text-align:left;"| 2021
| style="text-align:left;"| New York
| 1 || 0 || 9.0 || .000 || .000 || .000 || 0.0 || 0.0 || 0.0 || 0.0 || 0.0 || 0.0
|-
| style="text-align:left;"| 2022
| style="text-align:left;"| New York
| 3 || 0 || 7.3 || .364 || .000 || 1.000 || 1.3 || 0.0 || 0.0 || 0.0 || 0.0 || 4.7
|-
| style="text-align:left;"| Career
| style="text-align:left;"| 2 years, 1 team
| 4 || 0 || 7.8 || .333 || .000 || 1.000 || 1.0 || 0.0 || 0.0 || 0.0 || 0.0 || 3.5

References

1999 births
African-American basketball players
Living people
American sportspeople of Nigerian descent
American women's basketball players
Basketball players from Colorado
Forwards (basketball)
McDonald's High School All-Americans
New York Liberty draft picks
New York Liberty players
Sportspeople from Aurora, Colorado
UCLA Bruins women's basketball players
Basketball players at the 2019 Pan American Games
Pan American Games silver medalists for the United States
Pan American Games medalists in basketball
Medalists at the 2019 Pan American Games
21st-century African-American sportspeople
21st-century African-American women